Kabale Airport  is an airstrip serving Kabale, a town in the Kabale District in the Western Region of Uganda. It is one of the 46 airports in the country.

As of January 2010, the airport was not under the administration of the Civil Aviation Authority of Uganda.

Facilities
The airport has a single unpaved runway.

References

External links
 Airstrip planned for Kabale. eTurboNews. 10 February 2010.

Airports in Uganda
Kabale District